Arise, My Love is a 1940 American romantic comedy film directed by Mitchell Leisen and starring Claudette Colbert,  Ray Milland and Dennis O'Keefe. It was made by Paramount Pictures and written by Billy Wilder, Charles Brackett and Jacques Théry. Containing an interventionist message, it tells the love story of a pilot and a journalist who meet in the latter days of the Spanish Civil War and follows them through the early days of World War II. Colbert once said that Arise, My Love was her personal favorite motion picture of all the films she had made. 

Arise, My Love is based on the true story of Harold Edward Dahl. During the Spanish Civil War Dahl, who was fighting as a pilot for the Spanish Republican Air Force, was shot down and taken as prisoner of war. Initially sentenced to death, there were some diplomatic movements to free Dahl. His first wife, Edith Rogers, a known singer of impressive beauty, was said to have visited Francisco Franco herself to plead for his life. He remained in prison until 1940 and then returned to the United States.

Plot
American pilot Tom Martin (Ray Milland) is a soldier of fortune who went to Spain to fight in the Spanish Civil War. During the summer of 1939, he is languishing in a prison cell while awaiting execution. Unexpectedly granted a pardon on the morning that he is to face a firing squad, Tom's release has been managed by reporter Augusta "Gusto" Nash (Claudette Colbert), who posed as his wife. When the prison governor learns of the deception, the pair has to run for their lives.

Ending up in Paris, Tom tries, without success, to woo Gusto. When she is sent to Berlin as a correspondent, Tom pursues her with both of them again on the run as Hitler invades Poland. Booking passage on the ill-fated , the ship is torpedoed by a German submarine. After their rescue, Tom joins the RAF while Gusto remains in France as a war correspondent. At the fall of Paris, Tom is reunited with Gusto, and both decide to return home to convince Americans that a real danger awaits.

Cast

 Claudette Colbert as Augusta (Gusto) Nash
 Ray Milland as Tom Martin
 Dennis O'Keefe as Joe "Shep" Shepard
 Walter Abel as Mr. Phillips
 Dick Purcell as Pinky O'Connor
 George Zucco as Prison Governor
 Frank Puglia as Father Jacinto

 Esther Dale as Secretary
 Paul Leyssac as Bresson
 Ann Codee as Mme. Bresson
 Stanley Logan as Col. Tubbs Brown
 Lionel Pape as Lord Kettlebrook
 Aubrey Mather as Achille
 Cliff Nazarro as Botzelberg

Production

Filming for Arise, My Love began on June 24, 1940, on the Paramount lot and lasted until mid-August 1940, with the script continuously updated to incorporate actual events, such as the sinking of the SS Athenia and the signing of the armistice between France and Germany in the Forest of Compiègne. The character of Augusta Nash was reputedly based on that of Martha Gellhorn. "Dream Lover", composed by Victor Schertzinger, lyrics by Clifford Grey, was sung and hummed by Claudette Colbert. The song was originally introduced in The Love Parade (1929).
 
A Stinson A trimotor was featured in the film as a Spanish aircraft. Aerial coordinator Paul Mantz flew the aircraft.

Reception
Bosley Crowther,  film reviewer for The New York Times considered Arise, My Love a cynical way to exploit the war in Europe: "it is simply a synthetic picture which attempts to give consequence to a pleasant April-in-Paris romance by involving it in the realities of war—but a war which is patently conceived by some one who has been reading headlines in California. Miss Colbert and Mr. Milland are very charming when tête-a-tête. But, with Europe going up in flames around them, they are, paradoxically, not so hot. Same goes for the film."

Adaptations
Arise, My Love was adapted as a radio play on the June 8, 1942, episode of Lux Radio Theater with Milland joined by Loretta Young. It was also presented on the June 1, 1946, episode of Academy Award Theater, with Milland reprising his role.

Awards and nominations
Arise, My Love won the Oscar for Best Story (Benjamin Glazer and Hans Székely), and was nominated for Best Music (Victor Young), Best Cinematography (Charles Lang) and Best Art Direction (Hans Dreier and Robert Usher).

References

Notes

Citations

Bibliography

 Dick, Bernard F. Claudette Colbert: She Walked in Beauty. Jackson, Mississippi: University Press of Mississippi, 2008, .
 Farmer, James H. Celluloid Wings: The Impact of Movies on Aviation. Blue Ridge Summit, Pennsylvania: Tab Books Inc., 1984. .
 Paris, Michael. From the Wright Brothers to Top Gun: Aviation, Nationalism, and Popular Cinema. Manchester, UK: Manchester University Press, 1995. .

External links
 
 
 
 Arise, My Love on Academy Award Theater: June 1, 1946 
  by Jeanette MacDonald

1940 films
1940 romantic comedy films
American aviation films
American black-and-white films
Films scored by Victor Young
Films directed by Mitchell Leisen
Films set in France
Paramount Pictures films
Spanish Civil War films
World War II films made in wartime
Films that won the Academy Award for Best Story
Films with screenplays by Billy Wilder
Films with screenplays by Charles Brackett
American romantic comedy films
American World War II films
1940s English-language films